Chilocorus kuwanae, or Kuwana's lady beetle, is a species of lady beetle in the family Coccinellidae. It is native to Europe, Northern Asia (excluding China), and Southern Asia, and has been introduced to North America for biological pest control.

References

Further reading

 

Coccinellidae
Beetles described in 1909
Articles created by Qbugbot